Kamarak or Kamrak may refer to:
 Kamarak, Afghanistan
 Kamarak, Iran